Aulocera swaha, the common satyr, is a brown (Satyrinae) butterfly that is found in the Himalayas.

Range
The butterfly is found in the Himalayas in Afghanistan, and from Safed Koh, Astor, Chilas, Gilgit, Chitral, Kashmir and Kulu eastwards across to Sikkim.

Status
In 1932, William Harry Evans reported that the species was common from Chitral to Sikkim, and not rare westwards.

Description

The common satyr is 60 to 70 mm in wingspan. Dark brown above, basically ground colour with a bronze sheen. With a white band across both wings. The band varies from white to bright yellow and narrows towards the dorsum on the hindwing which it never reaches (except rarely in the females). It has a chequered fringe and a dark apical spot or ocellus on the forewing. The under hindwing is beautifully variegated with brown, white and grey. The colour below is paler than that of the great satyr (Aulocera padma) which is a larger and more common butterfly.

See also
Satyrinae
Nymphalidae
List of butterflies of India (Satyrinae)

References

 

Aulocera
Butterflies of Asia
Butterflies described in 1844